This is a list of archeological sites where remains or tools of Neanderthals were found.

Europe

Belgium
 Schmerling Caves, Engis
 Naulette
 Scladina
 Spy-sur-l'Orneau
 Veldwezelt-Hezerwater

France
 Vaucluse, Bau de l'Aubesier
 Biache-Saint-Vaast
 Bruniquel Cave
 Châtelperron
 Combe Grenal
 Eguisheim
 Grotte du Renne at Arcy-sur-Cure
 La Chaise
 La Chapelle-aux-Saints
 La Ferrassie
 La Quina
 Le Moustier
 Le Regourdou
 Lussac-les-Châteaux, Les Rochers-de-Villeneuve
 Ardèche#Prehistoric and ancient history, Moula-Guercy
 Saint-Césaire

Germany
 Ehringsdorf
 Neanderthal 1, Neander Valley
 Salzgitter-Lebenstedt

Netherlands
 Krijn, Northsea shore

United Kingdom
 Bontnewydd, Llanelwy   (Wales) 
 Creswell Crags (England)
 La Cotte de St Brelade (Jersey, Channel Islands) 
 Lynford Quarry (England)
 Swanscombe Heritage Park (England)

Spain
 Abrigo de la Quebrada (Valencian Community)
 L'Arbreda
 Atapuerca Mountains
 Axlor
 Banyoles (Catalonia) 
 Carihuela (Andalucia)
 Cova Foradà (Valencian Community)
 Cova Negra (Valencian Community)
 Cueva de Bolomor (Valencian Community, Spain) 
 Cueva Negra (Region of Murcia) 
 El Salt (Valencian Community)
 Roca dels Bous (archaeological site) 
 Sidrón Cave (Asturias) 
 Sima de las Palomas (Region of Murcia) 
 Zafarraya (Granada) 
 Cova del Gegant (Sitges)

Portugal
 Furninha cave
 Abrigo do Lagar Velho (Leiria) 
 Figueira Brava (Arrabida Mountains)

Gibraltar
 Neanderthals of Gibraltar

Italy
 Monte Circeo
 Saccopastore
 Altamura
 Guattari Cave

Croatia
 Krapina Neanderthal site
 Vindija Cave

Serbia
 Pešturina
 Velika Balanica

Slovenia
 Divje Babe

Slovakia
 Gánovce
 Ochoz
 Šaľa

Poland
 Jaskinia Ciemna

Ukraine
 Kiik-Koba
 Moldova I
 Staroselje

Czech Republic
 Kůlna
 Šipka

Russia
 Mezmaiskaya Cave 
 Sukhaya Mechetka

Romania
 Peștera cu Oase
 Peștera Muierilor

Asia

Israel
 Nahal Amud
 Kebara
 Tabun

Iran
 Bisitun Cave
 Wezmeh

Syria
 Dederiyeh

Turkey
 Karain

Lebanon
 Ksar Akil

Iraq
 Shanidar

Uzbekistan
 Teshik-Tash
 Aman-Kutan
 Obi-Rakhmat Grotto

Russia
 Chagyrskaya Cave
 Okladnikov Cave
 Denisova Cave

Azerbaijan
 Azykh Cave

References 

 
Archaeology-related lists